Saint: Why I Should Be Canonized Right Away is a book written by American Catholic radio host Lino Rulli. It was released on September 3, 2013 and is the sequel to Rulli's 2011 book, Sinner.

References

2013 non-fiction books